Meadow Creek is a  long 2nd order tributary to the Haw River, in Alamance County, North Carolina.

Course
Meadow Creek rises on the divide between it and Toms Creek (Cane Creek), about 6 miles south of Mebane in Alamance County, North Carolina and then flows southwest to the Haw River about 4 miles northwest of Saxapahaw, North Carolina.

Watershed
Meadow Creek drains  of area, receives about 46.3 in/year of precipitation, and has a wetness index of 435.67 and is about 50% forested.

See also
List of rivers of North Carolina

References

Rivers of North Carolina
Rivers of Alamance County, North Carolina